The Shchuka-class submarines, also referred to as Sh or Shch-class submarines, were a medium-sized class of Soviet submarines, built in large numbers and used during World War II. "Shchuka" is Russian for pike. Of this class, only two submarines (411 and 412) entered service after 1945, although they were launched before the war.

Development
On 23 January 1930, the USSR Revolutionary Military Council (Revvoensoviet) adapted a proposed submarine concept that were to "execute positioning service on closed theatres". Plans were made to construct up to 200 submarines in three main versions, the later ones would be larger and with longer range than the previous versions. However, due to the outbreak of World War II, only 88 submarines were commissioned. It was still to be the second most numerous submarine class of the Soviet Navy (only the M class were more numerous with 111 built). Seven ship construction yards were involved in the program - No. 189, 190, 194 in Leningrad, No. 112 in Gorky, No. 200 in Nikolaev and No. 202 in Vladivostok.

The name of the class was taken from the individual name of the first submarine Shch-301 Shchuka. Their numbering depended on which Soviet fleet they belonged to: the 100-series belonged to the Pacific Fleet, the 200-series to the Black Sea Fleet, the 300-series to the Baltic Fleet, and the 400-series to the Northern Fleet. There were however some special cases, i.e. the Northern Fleet submarine Shch-424 was renamed Shch-321 when she was transferred to the Baltic Fleet via the Stalin Canal (and later renamed back to Shch-424 when returning).
The conning tower had brass symbols as identifiers (Щ-XXX, where the XXX is the number).

Operational service

The Shchukas suffered heavy losses during the war. The Baltic, Black Sea and Northern Fleets lost 60–70% of their submarines. However, the submarines of the Pacific Fleet did not suffer any losses to the Japanese due to the tranquil nature of the theatre (military operations commenced only in the autumn of 1945 when the Japanese fleet largely was defeated). Three submarines were, however, lost to non-combat reasons. In all, 35 Shchuka-class submarines were lost, the vast majority during World War II.

The last surviving submarines of the class in the Soviet Navy were decommissioned in the mid-1950s and scrapped during the following years, but two submarines of this class (S-121 and S-123), along with two Soviet M-class submarines were supplied to People's Liberation Army Navy in June, 1954, thus becoming the foundation of the submarine force of the People's Republic of China. However, the two Shchuka-class submarines were not sold, but instead, loaned to China for training Chinese crews and were thus not given new names like the M-class submarines.

Ships of the class

Pacific Fleet

Shch-101
Shch-102
Shch-103 (lost 4 November 1935)
Shch-104
Shch-105
Shch-106
Shch-107
Shch-108
Shch-109
Shch-110
Shch-111
Shch-112
Shch-113
Shch-114
Shch-115
Shch-116
Shch-117 (lost 15 December 1952)
Shch-118
Shch-119
Shch-120
Shch-121
Shch-122
Shch-123
Shch-124
Shch-125
Shch-126
Shch-127
Shch-128
Shch-129
Shch-130
Shch-131
Shch-132
Shch-133
Shch-134
Shch-135
Shch-136
Shch-137
Shch-138 (lost 18 July 1942)
Shch-139

Black Sea Fleet

Shch-201
Shch-202
Shch-203 (lost 26 August 1943)
Shch-204 (lost 6 December 1941)
Shch-205
Shch-206 (Sunk by a group consisting of the Romanian torpedo boat Năluca, the Romanian gunboat Stihi Eugen and three Romanian motor torpedo boats on 9 July 1941)
Shch-207 (lost 26 August 1943)
Shch-208 (Sunk on 26 August 1942 by a mine of a flanking barrage laid by the Romanian minelayers Amiral Murgescu and Dacia)
Shch-209
Shch-210 (Sunk on 12 March 1942 off Cape Shabla by a mine in the Romanian minefield S-15, laid by the Romanian minelayers Amiral Murgescu, Regele Carol I and Dacia)
Shch-211 (Sunk on 16 November 1941 by a mine of a flanking barrage laid by the Romanian minelayers Amiral Murgescu and Dacia)
Shch-212 (Sunk on 11 December 1942 near Fidonisi Island off the coast of Sulina by a Romanian minefield, laid by the Romanian minelayers Amiral Murgescu, Regele Carol I and Dacia)
 (Sunk on 14 October 1942 off Constanța by a mine, in a minefield laid by the Romanian minelayers Amiral Murgescu, Regele Carol I  and Aurora; wreck found 13 September 2010)
 (lost 19 June 1942)

Shch-216 (lost 17 February 1944; wreck found July 2013)

Baltic Fleet

Shch-301 (lost 28 August 1941)
Shch-302 (lost October 1942)
Shch-303 - failed to sink Soviet freighter Metallist with two torpedoes, used by Admiral Nikolay Kuznetsov to accuse Polish submarine ORP Orzeł after the Orzeł incident, as a pretext to seize Estonia.
Shch-304 (lost November 1942)
Shch-305 (Sunk 5 November 1942 by Finnish submarine Vetehinen)
Shch-306 (lost 12 November 1942)
Shch-307
Shch-308 (lost 26 October 1942)
Shch-309
Shch-310
Shch-311 (lost 12 October 1942)
Shch-315
 (lost 15 July 1942)
Shch-318
Shch-319 (lost 29 September 1941)
Shch-320 (lost 27 October 1942)
Shch-322 (lost 11 October 1941)
Shch-323 (lost 1 May 1943)
Shch-324 (lost 5 November 1941)

Northern Fleet

Shch-401 (lost 23 April 1942)
Shch-402 (lost 21 September 1944)
Shch-403 (lost 2 October 1943)
Shch-404
Shch-405 (lost 13 July 1942)
Shch-406 (lost 29 May 1943)
Shch-407
Shch-408 (lost 25 May 1943)
Shch-411
Shch-413 (scrapped before completion in July 1941)
Shch-414 (scrapped before completion in July 1941)
Shch-421 (lost 9 April 1942)
Shch-422 (lost 5 July 1943)
Shch-424 (lost 20 October 1939)

See also
"Shchuka" is a traditional Russian/Soviet submarine name, often given to the first submarine of a new class of a new generation of submarines. For instance, the first submarine of the early 20th century  carried the name. Also at least two other, newer Soviet/Russian submarine classes carries the name, however, the NATO reporting names differ. These are the Project 671 Shchuka (NATO: Victor III) and Project 971 Shchuka-B.

References

Bibliography

Submarine classes
 
 
Russian and Soviet navy submarine classes